David Imlah is an Australian curler and curling coach.

At the international level, he is a  curler.

Teams and events

Record as a coach of national teams

References

External links

Living people
Australian male curlers
Pacific-Asian curling champions

Australian curling coaches
Year of birth missing (living people)